The 15th Rhythmic Gymnastics European Championships were held in Budapest, Hungary from 28 May to 30 May 1999.

Medal winners

Medal table

References 

1999 in gymnastics
Rhythmic Gymnastics European Championships